Aprindine is a Class 1b antiarrhythmic agent.

References

2-Aminoindanes
Anilines
Antiarrhythmic agents
Sodium channel blockers
Diethylamino compounds